Dai Zong is a fictional character in Water Margin, one of the Four Great Classical Novels in Chinese literature. Nicknamed "Magic Traveller", he ranks 20th among the 36 Heavenly Spirits, the first third of the 108 Stars of Destiny.

Background
The novel depicts Dai Zong as having a broad face, a squarish mouth and a lean body. He can cover 800 li in a day on foot by incanting a magical spell to activate power in two talismans tied to his legs. Because he is an incredibly fast runner, he is nicknamed "Magic Traveller".

Meeting Song Jiang
A chief warden of a prison in Jiangzhou (江州; present-day Jiujiang, Jiangxi), Dai Zong is a good friend of Wu Yong, the chief strategist of the outlaw band at Liangshan Marsh.

When Song Jiang is exiled to Jiangzhou as a mitigated sentence for killing his mistress Yan Poxi, he passes by Liangshan and meets Wu Yong, who writes a letter for him to take to Dai Zong. The letter requests Dai to treat Song well. In Jiangzhou, Dai initially wants Song Jiang to bribe him in exchange for lenient treatment. After reading Wu Yong's letter, Dai Zong apologises and makes all efforts to ensure Song has a comfortable life in prison. In fact Song can go in and out of the prison camp at will. He also comes to know and develop a strong bond with Dai Zong's subordinate, the jailer Li Kui.

Becoming an outlaw
One day Song Jiang, feeling miserable over his misfortunes, writes a poem on the wall of a restaurant after getting drunk. The seditious poem is discovered by a petty official Huang Wenbing, who reports it to Cai Jiu, the prefect of Jiangzhou. Cai orders Dai Zong to take Song to him. Dai tells Song to pretend to be insane to suggest the poem is the scribble of a mad man. However, Huang Wenbing sees through the pretence and suggests giving Song a sound beating to make him "sober". Song eventually admits that his mind is sound.

Viewing the case as a grave matter, Cai Jiu writes a letter to his father, the Grand Tutor Cai Jing, in the imperial capital Dongjing (東京; present-day Kaifeng, Henan), to seek advice. Dai Zong is assigned to deliver the letter. When resting at an inn of Liangshan run by Zhu Gui, Dai is drugged. Luckily the letter on him reveals his identity. He is brought to Chao Gai, the chief of Liangshan, and Wu Yong. Wu suggests faking a letter by Cai Jing to order Cai Jiu to send Song Jiang to Dongjing for punishment. The plan is to rescue Song midway. But he needs the help of the scholar Xiao Rang, who could imitate Cai Jing‘s distinctive and universally recognised handwriting, and the engraver Jin Dajian, who could fabricate Cai‘s personal seal. Dai Zong hurries to call on the two men and lies to them that their skills are needed in the renovation of a temple. Xiao and Jin are brought near to Liangshan, where they are kidnapped. The two have no choice but to join the stronghold and participate in Wu Yong's plan.

Cai Jiu nearly falls for the ruse. However, Huang Wenbing points out that the seal on the letter is not an appropriate one between father and son -- a sign that the letter is fake. Furious that Dai Zong has betrayed him, Cai Jiu orders his arrest. At Huang‘s urging, Cai Jiu sentences both Dai and Song to death. Meanwhile, Wu Yong has realised the mistake in the letter. He sends several chieftains to rescue the two in Jiangzhou. Just when the executioners are about to swing their knives in the public execution, Li Kui jumps out and kills them. The Liangshan chieftains surrounding the place also rush forth to fight off the soldiers. Dai Zong follows the outlaws back to Liangshan.

Dai Zong serves Liangshan well with his running speed, which is especially important in an emergency situation. For example, when Song Jiang is thwarted by the sorcery of Gao Lian in his military attack on Gaotangzhou (高唐州; around present-day Gaotang County, Shandong) to rescue Chai Jin,  Dai Zong is despatched to Jizhou (薊州; present-day Ji County, Tianjin) with Li Kui to locate the Taoist magician Gongsun Sheng, who could rival Gao. Gongsun has left Liangshan to visit his mother and has failed to return. Li Kui is enabled to travel in the same pace as Dai, but he could not make a brake when propelled by Dai into dizzying speeds after he infringed the latter's order to keep to vegetarian food. They eventually find Gongsun and the three speed to Gaotangzhou. In another instance, Dai brings the physician An Daoquan speedily back to Liangshan to cure Song Jiang of a deadly tumour. Dai's speed is also crucial in the collection and conveyance of intelligence when Liangshan faces a hostile force. His speed could help make friendship too, such as when Yang Lin notices his unusual pace and calls out his name.

Campaigns and death
Dai Zong is appointed as the chief of Liangshan's scouting team after the 108 Stars of Destiny came together in what is called the Grand Assembly. He participates in the campaigns against the Liao invaders and rebel forces in Song territory following amnesty from Emperor Huizong for Liangshan.

Dai Zong is one of the few Liangshan heroes who survive the run of campaigns. He is awarded an official post in Yanzhou (兗州; around present-day Jining, Shandong). But he soon resigns and lives as a recluse in a Taoist temple, where he dies shortly.

References
 
 
 
 
 
 
 

36 Heavenly Spirits
Fictional characters who can move at superhuman speeds
Fictional prison officers and governors
Fictional characters from Jiangxi